The Aldermaston Brewery (later known as Strange's Brewery) was a brewery located near Aldermaston in Berkshire, UK.

History 
The brewery was established at Aldermaston Wharf in 1770, adjacent to the Kennet and Avon Canal.  The brewery was bought by Thomas Strange in 1833.  William Jeffreys Strange operated the brewery until 1902, after whom it was managed by John J Strange.  In 1910, W.J. Strange & Sons was registered as a limited liability company.  For many years, the Strange family lived at Bridge House in nearby Mill Lane.  The house is now part of the local Steiner school.

In 1922, Strange's bought The Bladebone in Chapel Row for £3,500 (equivalent to approximately £150,000 in 2008). The dues for this land were £86 (£3,500 in 2008) per annum.

The brewery supplied ale and stout to The Stocks pub in Beenham.

Buy-out 
The business maintained operations until 1945, when it was bought out by Scrace's Brewery in Southampton and stopped production. The company was acquired by Strong's of Romsey in 1950 and the site was demolished.  In 1995, the site of the brewery was built upon in the expansion of Aldermaston Wharf.

References 

Aldermaston
Defunct breweries of the United Kingdom
Companies based in Berkshire
Food and drink companies established in 1770
Food and drink companies disestablished in 1950
1770 establishments in England
1950 disestablishments in England
British companies disestablished in 1950
British companies established in 1770
Breweries in England